Benedetti may refer to :

Elia Benedettini (born 22 June 1995), Sammarinese footballer who currently plays for Novara Calcio and the San Marino national football team
Ernesto Benedettini (born 5 March 1948), Sammarinese politician
Giacomo Benedettini (born 7 October 1982), Sammarinese footballer who currently plays for S.P. Tre Fiori and the San Marino national football team
Pierluigi Benedettini (born August 18, 1961 in Murata), retired Sammarinese footballer who played as a goalkeeper